The Seminole in the American Civil War were found in both the Trans-Mississippi and Western Theaters. The Seminole Nation in the Trans-Mississippi Theater had split alliances. However, the majority of the tribe in the Western territories joined the Union Army under the leadership of Billy Bowlegs. Others, such as John Jumper, supported the Confederacy. The Florida Seminole participated in some skirmishing in central Florida. They were likely at the Battle of Olustee in February 1864.

Trans-Mississippi Theater

In 1884, The Philadelphia Inquirer stated that nearly all of the Seminoles "espoused the cause of the Union" and because all of the neighboring tribes (Choctaws, Chickasaws, Cherokees, and Creeks) "almost unanimously joined the Southern Confederacy, it was neither agreeable nor safe for the Seminoles to continue living in the Indian Territory." As the Seminole fled south, across the U.S.-Mexican border, "they were attacked by a Confederate regiment and their principal chieftain [Billy Bowlegs] killed." The remaining Seminoles crossed into Mexico and remained there until after the Civil War.

The Seminole Nation, those who didn't move to Mexico, was led by John Jumper. Jumper's Seminole name was "Hemha Micco." He was commissioned in the Confederacy as a major, lieutenant colonel, and colonel. He was in the battles of Round Mountain, Chusto-Talasah, Middle Boggy, and Second Cabin Creek.

First Seminole Battalion (Mounted Volunteers)

The First Seminole Battalion was organized on September 21, 1861.

First Seminole Regiment (Mounted Volunteers)
The First Seminole Battalion re-organized as the 1st Seminole Regiment on July 1, 1864.

Organization

The Seminole Nation organized into companies, battalions, and regiments.

First Seminole Battalion (Mounted Volunteers)
Field & Staff: Major John Jumper
Companies: Company A (Captain George Cloud) and Company B (Captain Fushatchie Cochokna)
First Seminole Regiment (Mounted Volunteers)
Field & Staff: Colonel John Jumper, Major George Cloud, Charles C. Dyer (A.Q.M.), D. R. Patterson (Adjutant), W. W. Burnes ( Assistant Surgeon), Hu McDonald (A.Q.M.)
Companies: Company A (Captain Thomas Cloud), Company B (Captain Fushatchie Cochokna), Company C (Captain James Factor), Company D (Captain Tustanucogee), Company E (Captain Sam Hill), and Company F (Captain Osuchee Harjo)

Western Theater

In Florida, two distinct companies were raised who had Seminole Indians as members of the Confederate Army. Andrew E. Hodges, a white man who lived on the coast near Cedar Key, raised a company of Indian sharp shooters starting in 1862. Hodges' Company not only had Seminole Indians but whites, Hispanics, blacks, and other tribal members in his unit. Seminoles may have played a sharp shooter role at the Battle of Olustee. By July 1864, Hodges had passed his company to Andrew M. McBride. McBride was elected captain and wrote Secretary of War James A. Seddon that the company was ready for service.

Hodges' Company

At the opening of the Civil War, Andrew E. Hodges was living near Cedar Key, Florida. In 1862, he was part of a home guard that navigated the waterways and coasts. Later that year he raised a company of sharp shooters.

McBride's Company

McBride had mustered 65 individuals on July 7, 1864 at Everglades, Florida. On the muster roll the following was declared, "We, the undersigned, respectfully volunteer and tender our services to the Confederate States of America, begging to be immediately admitted into their armies, having chosen A. McBride for our Captain."

Organization

Hodges' Company (organizational life: 1862-July 1864)
Company (Andrew E. Hodges)
McBride's Company (organizational life: July 1864 – 1865)
Company (Captain Andrew M. McBride)
Total: 65 men

Battles

Battle of Olustee

Aftermath

Trans-Mississippi Theater

Reconstruction was a particularly harsh for the Indian nations found west of the Mississippi.

Western Theater

After the War ended, the Seminole Indians became reclusive, and their history was obscured. Florida's Seminole Indians continue to live in and around the Everglades.

Both Andrew E. Hodges and Andrew M. McBride survived the War. They lived out the remainder of their lives in Florida.

See also

Florida in the American Civil War

External links
 John Jumper.

References

Seminole
Native Americans in the American Civil War
Indian Territory in the American Civil War